Prairie Hills USD 113 is a public unified school district headquartered in Sabetha, Kansas, United States.  The district includes the communities of Sabetha, Axtell, Bern, Goff, Morrill, Summerfield, Wetmore, Berwick, and nearby rural areas.

Schools
The school district operates the following schools:
 Sabetha High School
 Sabetha Junior High School
 Sabetha Elementary School
 Axtell Public School
 Wetmore Academic Center

History
After Dawson-Verdon Public Schools in Nebraska closed in 2004, some students were to choose the public schools of Sabetha.

It was formed in 2010 by the merger of Sabetha USD 441 and Axtel USD 488.

Closed schools:
 Bern High School
 Bern Elementary School
 Summerfield Elementary School

See also
 Kansas State Department of Education
 Kansas State High School Activities Association
 List of high schools in Kansas
 List of unified school districts in Kansas

References

External links
 

School districts in Kansas
Education in Brown County, Kansas
Education in Marshall County, Kansas
Education in Nemaha County, Kansas
School districts established in 2010
2010 establishments in Kansas